Burkes is a surname. Notable people with the names include:

Ida Burkes or Ida Dorsey (c. 1866–1988), American madam
Wayne Burkes (1929–2020), American politician

See also
Burks, surname
Berkes, surname
Birks (surname)
Burke, surname and given name